Joanna Skowrońska (born ) is a former artistic gymnast who represented Poland in international competitions. She is a 2-time Universiade medalist from 2001 and 2003 and a 6-time Polish national all-around champion (1996, 1999-2001, 2003, 2006). She represented Poland at the 2000 Summer Olympic Games in Sydney.

She also competed at the World Artistic Gymnastics Championships in 1999, 2001, 2002, 2003, 2005, 2006

References

External links
the-sports.org
Sports Reference
rte.ie
BBC
intlgymnast.com
intlgymnast.com
Reuters
YouTube

1982 births
Living people
Polish female artistic gymnasts
People from Kamienna Góra
Sportspeople from Lower Silesian Voivodeship
Gymnasts at the 2000 Summer Olympics
Olympic gymnasts of Poland
Universiade medalists in gymnastics
Universiade silver medalists for Poland
Universiade bronze medalists for Poland
Medalists at the 2001 Summer Universiade
Medalists at the 2003 Summer Universiade